William Dixon Foster (December 24, 1888 – May 6, 1973) was an American football, basketball and baseball coach. He served as the head football coach (1917, 1919), head men's basketball coach (1916–1920) and head baseball coach (1917–1920) at the University of South Carolina.

Foster was a graduate of Hampden–Sydney College in Hampden Sydney, Virginia.

Head coaching record

Football

References

External links
 

1888 births
1973 deaths
Hampden–Sydney Tigers football players
South Carolina Gamecocks athletic directors
South Carolina Gamecocks baseball coaches
South Carolina Gamecocks football coaches
South Carolina Gamecocks men's basketball coaches
High school football coaches in South Carolina
High school football coaches in West Virginia